Operation Ivory Coast was a mission conducted by United States Special Operations Forces and other American military elements to rescue U.S. prisoners of war during the Vietnam War. It was also the first joint military operation in United States history conducted under the direct control of the Chairman of the Joint Chiefs of Staff. The specially selected raiders extensively trained and rehearsed the operation at Eglin Air Force Base, Florida, while planning and intelligence gathering continued from 25 May to 20 November 1970.

The objective of the operation was the recovery of 61 American prisoners of war thought to be held at the camp. It was found during the raid that the camp contained no prisoners as they had previously been moved to another camp.

Despite the absence of prisoners, the raid's execution was nearly flawless, with only two casualties and two aircraft losses (one of the aircraft losses was due to a planned crash landing during the assault on the prisoner compound). Criticism of the failure to detect the removal of the POWs prior to the raid, both public and within the administration of President Richard Nixon, led to a major reorganization of the United States intelligence community a year later.

Planning, organization and training

Polar Circle 
The concept of a rescue mission inside North Vietnam began on 9 May 1970. An Air Force intelligence unit concluded through analysis of aerial photography that a compound near Sơn Tây, suspected since late 1968 of being a prisoner of war camp, contained 55 American POWs and that at least six were in urgent need of rescue. 12,000 North Vietnamese troops were stationed within  of the camp. After validation of their findings, Brigadier general (BG) James R. Allen, the deputy director for plans and policy at Headquarters USAF, met in the Pentagon on 25 May with Army BG Donald Blackburn, Special Assistant for Counterinsurgency and Special Activities (SACSA). Blackburn reported directly to the Chairman of the Joint Chiefs of Staff and had also been the first commander of the covert Studies and Observation Group in Vietnam.

Blackburn immediately met with General Earle G. Wheeler, the outgoing JCS Chairman, to recommend a rescue of all the POWs at Son Tây. To study the feasibility of a raid, Wheeler authorized a 15-member planning group under the codename Polar Circle that convened on June 10. One of its members was an officer who would actually participate in the raid as a rescue helicopter pilot. The study group, after a review of all available intelligence, concluded that Sơn Tây contained 61 POWs.

When Blackburn's recommendation that he lead the mission himself was turned down, he asked Colonel Arthur D. Simons on 13 July to command the Army's personnel. Eglin Air Force Base was selected as the joint training site for the prospective force. Personnel selection proceeded over the objections of the Marine Corps, which was excluded from participation, but selection and planning was performed by Special Operations "operators", not by the JCS, to avoid service parochialism, resulting in a force chosen for mission needs, highlighting combat experience in Southeast Asia and operational specialty skills, and not rank or branch of service.

Ivory Coast 
The second phase, Operation Ivory Coast, began on 8 August 1970, when Admiral Thomas H. Moorer, the new JCS Chairman, designated  Manor as commander and Simons as deputy commander of the mission task force. Ivory Coast was the organization, planning, training, and deployment phase of the operation. Manor set up an Air Force training facility at Eglin's Duke Field and brought together a 27-member planning staff that included 11 from the prior feasibility study.

Simons recruited 103 personnel from interviews of 500 volunteers, most were Special Forces personnel of the 6th and 7th Special Forces Groups at Fort Bragg, North Carolina. USAF planners selected key Air Force commanders, who then picked personnel for their crews. Helicopter and A-1 Skyraider crews were put together from instructors at Eglin and personnel returned from Southeast Asia. Two crews for C-130E(I) Combat Talons were assembled from squadrons in West Germany and North Carolina. All were then asked to volunteer for a temporary duty assignment without additional pay and without being told the nature of the mission. 103 Army and 116 USAF personnel were selected for the project, including ground force members, aircrewmen, support members and planners. The 219-man task force planned, trained, and operated under the title of the "Joint Contingency Task Group" (JCTG).

The planning staff set up parameters for a nighttime raid, the key points of which were clear weather and a quarter moon at 35 degrees above the horizon for optimum visibility during low-level flight. From these parameters, two mission "windows" were identified, 18–25 October and 18–25 November. Training proceeded on Range C-2 at Eglin using an exact but crudely made replica of the prison compound for rehearsals and a $60,000 five-foot-by-five-foot scale table model (codenamed "Barbara") for familiarization.

Air Force crews flew 1,054 hours in southern Alabama, Georgia, and Florida conducting "dissimilar (aircraft) formation" training with both UH-1H and HH-3E helicopters at night and at low-level (a flight profile for which procedures had to be innovated by the two selected crews), and gaining expertise in navigation training using forward looking infrared (FLIR), which, until Ivory Coast, had not been part of the Combat Talon's electronics suite. A vee formation in which the slower helicopters drafted in echelon slightly above and behind each wing of the Combat Talon escort aircraft was chosen and refined for the mission to give the helicopters the speed necessary to keep pace with the Talons flying just above their stall speeds.

Special Forces training began on 9 September, advancing to night training on 17 September and joint training with air crews on 28 September that included six rehearsals a day, three of them under night conditions. By 6 October, 170 practice sessions of all or partial phases of the mission were performed on the mockup by the Special Forces troopers, many with live fire. On that date, the first full-scale dress rehearsal, using a UH-1H as the assault helicopter, was conducted at night and included a 5.5-hour,  flight of all aircraft, replicating the timing, speeds, altitudes and turns in the mission plan. The rehearsal spelled the end of the option to use the UH-1 when its small passenger compartment resulted in leg cramps to the Special Forces troopers that completely disrupted the timing of their assault, more than offsetting the UH-1's only advantage (smaller rotor radius) over the larger HH-3. Two further full night rehearsals and a total of 31 practice landings by the HH-3E in the mockup's courtyard confirmed the choice.

On 24 September, Manor recommended approval of the October window to US Secretary of Defense Melvin Laird, with 21 October as the primary execution date. However, at a White House briefing on 8 October with National Security Advisor Henry Kissinger and General Alexander M. Haig, Kissinger delayed the mission to the November window because President Nixon was not in Washington and could not be briefed in time for approval of the October window. This delay, while posing a risk of compromising the secrecy of the mission, had the benefits of additional training, acquisition of night-vision equipment and further reconnaissance of the prison.

Manor and Simons met with the commander of Task Force 77, Vice Admiral Frederic A. Bardshar, aboard his flagship  on 5 November to arrange for a diversionary mission to be flown by naval aircraft. Because of policy restrictions of the bombing halt then in place, the naval aircraft would not carry ordnance except for a few planes tasked for Combat Search and Rescue (CSAR).

Between 10 and 18 November, the JCTG moved to its staging base at Takhli Royal Thai Air Force Base, Thailand. The Combat Talons, using the call signs Daw 43 and Thumb 66 in the guise of being a part of Project Heavy Chain, left Eglin on 10 November, flew to Norton Air Force Base, California, and then routed through Hickam Air Force Base, Hawaii and Kadena Air Base, Okinawa, arriving in Takhli on 14 November. The next day, four C-141 Starlifters departed one per day (to avoid the appearance of a major operation in progress), carrying the Army contingent of the JCTG, its equipment and the UH-1 helicopter from Eglin to Thailand. The Special Forces personnel arrived in Thailand at 03:00 local time 18 November and later that date President Nixon approved execution of the mission, setting in motion the final phase, Operation Kingpin.

After overcoming in-theater friction with the 1st Weather Group at Tan Son Nhut Air Base, South Vietnam, planners began watching the weather during the week before the projected target date. On 18 November, Typhoon Patsy struck the Philippines and headed west towards Hanoi. Weather forecasts indicated that Patsy would cause bad weather over the Gulf of Tonkin on 21 November, preventing carrier support operations, and converging with a cold front coming out of southern China, would cause poor conditions over North Vietnam for the remainder of the window. The presence of the cold front, however, indicated that conditions in the objective area on 20 November would be good and possibly acceptable over Laos for navigation of the low-level penetration flights. A reconnaissance flight on the afternoon of 20 November by an RF-4C Phantom carrying a weather specialist confirmed the forecast. Manor decided to advance the mission date by 24 hours rather than delay it by five days.

Manor issued the formal launch order at 15:56 local time 20 November, while the raiding force was in the final stages of crew rest, and brought together the entire ground contingent for a short briefing regarding the objective and launch times. Following the briefing, Manor and his staff flew by T-39 Sabreliner to Da Nang Air Base, where they would monitor the mission from the USAF Tactical Air Control Center, North Sector (TACC/NS) at Monkey Mountain Facility. Three theater lift C-130s previously staged at U-Tapao Royal Thai Navy Airfield arrived at Takhli to transport the Army contingent and helicopter crews to Udorn RTAFB and the A-1 pilots to Nakhon Phanom.

Mission organization

Special Forces 

The fifty-six Special Forces troopers selected to conduct the raid were flown from Takhli to their helicopter staging base at Udorn RTAFB by C-130 on the evening of 20 November. The Special Forces were organized into three platoons: a 14-man assault group, codenamed Blueboy, which would crash-land within the prison compound; a 22-man support group, Greenleaf, which would provide immediate support for the assault team and a 20-man security group, Redwine, to protect the prison area from People's Army of Vietnam (PAVN) reaction forces and provide backup support if needed for either of the other two groups. Simons (using the call sign Axle)  accompanied the Greenleaf group, while the ground force commander, LTC Elliott P. "Bud" Sydnor Jr. (Wildroot), was with the Redwine group.

The 56 raiders were heavily armed, carrying a total of 51 personal sidearms, 48 CAR-15 carbines, two M16 rifles, four M79 grenade launchers, two shotguns and four M60 machine guns. They carried 15 Claymore mines, 11 demolition charges and 213 hand grenades and were equipped with a plethora of wire cutters, bolt cutters, axes, chainsaws, crowbars, ropes, bullhorns, lights and other equipment (much of it acquired from commercial retail sources) to execute the mission. The ground force was also equipped for voice communications with 58 UHF-AM and 34 VHF-FM radios, including a survival radio for each individual soldier.

Aviation support 

116 aircraft (59 Navy and 57 USAF) participated in the operation, with 28 aircraft (crewed by 92 airmen) assigned direct roles in the target area. Two C-130E(I) Combat Talons, modified with the temporary addition of FLIR sets, were assigned to navigate the mission. One was to lead the helicopter "assault formation" (Cherry 01) and the second to escort the A-1 "strike formation" (Cherry 02). Because of the variances in cruising speeds between the helicopters and fixed-wing aircraft, the forces flew separate routes, with the faster strike formation trailing the helicopter formation by several minutes and zig-zagging across its route. Each Combat Talon crew cross-trained to assume the role of the other, but the assault formation was required to have a navigation leader with four fully functioning engines all the way to the objective.

The 28 aircraft with direct roles were:

Execution of Operation Kingpin

Penetration into North Vietnam 
Beginning at 22:00 20 November 1970, aircraft began leaving five bases in Thailand and one in South Vietnam. Cherry 02, the Combat Talon escort for the A-1 strike formation, took off from Takhli at 22:25. Cherry 01, scheduled to take off a half hour later, had difficulty starting an engine and took off 23 minutes late at 23:18. Cherry 01 adjusted its flight plan and made up the time lost at engine start. At 23:07, two HC-130P aerial refuelers (call signs Lime 01 and Lime 02) took off from Udorn, followed by the helicopters ten minutes later. Shortly after midnight, the A-1 Skyraiders lifted off four minutes early from Nakhon Phanom RTAFB under blacked-out conditions. The helicopters encountered thick clouds over northern Laos at their refueling altitude and climbed to  AGL (Above Ground Level) to refuel from Lime 01 on the flight plan's fourth leg. Lime 01 then led them to the next checkpoint for hand-off to Cherry 01 at 01:16.

The formations flew roughly parallel tracks that crossed Laos to the west of the Plain of Jars before turning northeastward. Both formations flew twelve planned legs. The Combat Talon navigators had the task of keeping the formations on the center line of the corridor. The Combat Talon C-130s experienced sluggish flight controls at the required airspeeds and the A-1s were hampered by their heavy ordnance loads.

The Terrain Avoidance mode (adapted from the AN/APQ-99 terrain avoidance radar of the RF-4C photo reconnaissance aircraft) was distorted by the nose-high attitude dictated by the slow speeds and would no longer display hazardous terrain directly in front of or below the Combat Talon's flight path. The Doppler radar (used to calculate wind drift and ground speed) often had to use information in its computer's memory because of processing lapses. While the ground-mapping radar (correlating landmarks shown on maps to radar returns) was not affected, the jungle terrain did not provide easily identifiable points. All of these handicaps were overcome with the external pod installation of FLIR, which readily identified the rivers and lakes used as turning points.

The assault formation approached from the southwest using the clutter returns of the mountains to mask them from radar detection, while U.S. Navy aircraft launched at 01:00 21 November from the aircraft carriers  and Ranger in the largest carrier night operation of the Vietnam War. Starting at 01:52, 20 A-7 Corsairs and A-6 Intruders, flying in pairs at stepped-up altitudes to deconflict their flight paths, entered North Vietnamese airspace on three tracks, dropping flares to simulate an attack. The last track also dropped chaff to mimic the mining of Haiphong harbor. Over the Gulf of Tonkin, 24 other aircraft in 13 orbits provided support and protection. The operation prompted a frantic air defense reaction at 02:17 that provided a highly effective diversion for the raiders and completely saturated the North Vietnamese air defense system.

Both USAF formations, over a period of thirteen minutes, were unavoidably but separately exposed for several minutes each to an early warning radar located at Na San, North Vietnam,  to the north, because the flight tracks had to be routed around uncharted mountains. Neither formation was detected, possibly because of the diversion. The rescue forces entered the Red River valley at  AGL to find conditions clear and visibility excellent. The helicopter formation reached its Initial Point (20 kilometers—12 minutes flying time—from Son Tây) with the A-1 strike formation two minutes behind, as planned. The HH-3E assault team helicopter had flown formation just behind and above the left wingtip of Cherry 01, drafting on the leader to gain the additional airspeed needed to bring its cruise airspeed safely above the stalling speed of the Combat Talon.

Combat assault 
After Apple 03 made its strafing pass with side-firing miniguns on the prison's guard towers, Cherry 01 successfully dropped one of two planned napalm ground markers as a point of reference for the A-1s, then departed the objective area to a holding point over Laos where it would provide UHF direction-finding steers for the departing aircraft.

The assault helicopters in single file encountered winds that caused them to break formation  to the right of their intended track. The pilots of Apple 03, the gunship helicopter preceding the others, observed a compound nearly identical to the prison camp in size and layout (previously labeled a "secondary school" by intelligence sources) and steered toward it, followed by the assault lift force. However, they recognized their error when they saw the river next to the actual location and corrected their flight path. Banana, the HH-3E carrying the Blueboy assault team, descended on the wrong location and observed that the expected courtyard was much smaller than required and that the expected treeline enclosed the compound rather than crossing through it. By that time, Blueboy (as previously rehearsed) was firing its weapons from all openings in the helicopter. Banana's pilots also recognized the error, applied power and quickly veered north to the actual target.

Despite the error and trees taller than briefed that forced a steeper descent than rehearsed, the assault team crash-landed into the courtyard of Sơn Tây prison at 02:19 with all weapons firing. Although one raider, acting as a door gunner, was thrown from the aircraft, the only casualty was the helicopter's flight engineer, whose ankle was fractured by a dislodged fire extinguisher. Army Captain Richard J. Meadows used a bullhorn to announce their presence to the expected POWs, while the team dispersed in four elements on a rapid and violent assault of the prison, killing guards and methodically searching the five prisoner blocks cell by cell.

Also at 02:19, Apple 01 (after its pilots saw Banana fire on the first location) landed the Greenleaf support group outside the south side of the secondary school, thinking it to be the target prison compound. Unaware that it was 400 meters from the objective, it lifted off to relocate to its holding area. The "secondary school" was actually a barracks for troops that, alerted by Banana's aborted assault, opened fire on Greenleaf as two of its elements assaulted the compound. The support group attacked the location with small arms and hand grenades in an eight-minute firefight, after which Simons estimated that 100 to 200 hostile soldiers had been killed. Two A-1s supported Greenleaf with an air strike using white phosphorus bombs on a wooden footbridge east of the area. Apple 01 returned at 02:23, and by 02:28, the support group had disengaged under fire and reboarded the helicopter for the short movement to the correct landing area.

The pilot of Apple 02 observed the errors in navigation by the helicopters in front of him and made a hard turn towards the prison. He also observed Apple 01 unload at the secondary school and initiated Plan Green, the contingency plan for the loss or absence of Greenleaf. The Redwine security group, including ground force commander Sydnor, landed at 02:20 outside Sơn Tây prison and immediately executed the previously rehearsed contingency plan. In the meantime, Cherry 02 arrived with the A-1 force, dropped two more napalm ground markers, and created other diversions to disguise the target area by dropping MK-6 log flares and battle simulators at road intersections that North Vietnamese reaction forces might be expected to use. Cherry 02 then orbited in the area just west of the Black River acting as on-call support for the ground teams, jamming North Vietnamese radio communications, and providing a secure radio link to the mission command post in Da Nang.

After a thorough search that included a second sweep ordered by Meadows, Blueboy'''s three teams found that the prison held no POWs.Meadows himself did not enter any cellblock but coordinated his team from the center of the courtyard. Meadows transmitted the code phrase "Negative Items" to the command group.Gargus (2007), p.203; Schemmer (1976), p. 172; Thigpen (2001), p. 156; and Glines. Pathfinders clearing the extraction landing zone blew up an electrical tower that blacked out the entire west side of Sơn Tây including the prison area. At 02:29, Sydnor ordered the A-1s to attack the vehicle bridge over the Song Con leading into the area and, three minutes later, called for extraction by the HH-53s idling on the ground in a holding area a mile away. Before the first helicopter arrived, a truck convoy approached the prison from the south, but was stopped by two Redwine security teams that each fired an M72 light antitank weapon into the lead vehicle.The convoy was engaged separately by the teams, four minutes apart.

At 02:28, Cherry 02's electronic warfare operator noted that Fan Song fire control radars for North Vietnamese SA-2 SAM sites had gone active. SAM launches at the F-105 Wild Weasel force began at 02:35, with at least 36 missiles fired at the rescue forces.Participants anecdotally put the number of SAMs much higher, with three or more in the air continuously for eleven minutes. One F-105 was briefly enveloped in burning fuel by a near-miss at 02:40 and returned to base. Its replacement was severely damaged six minutes later by another SAM. Twenty other SAMs fired at Navy aircraft all missed. Two MiG-21 interceptors on alert duty at Phúc Yên Air Base were never given permission to launch, despite several requests to do so.

 Extraction of the raiders 
The HH-53s returned singly to the extraction landing zone amidst the SAM barrage, flying well below the minimum effective level of the missiles, and Apple 01 landed first at 02:37. It lifted off with its passengers at 02:40, followed a minute later by the landing of Apple 02, which departed at 02:45. Apple 03, the last aircraft out, was cleared to leave its holding area at 02:48. The raid had been executed in only 27 minutes,Raid time calculated from 02:18 (execute command) to 02:45 (last extraction). well within the planned 30-minute optimum time. Although at first it was feared one raider had been left behind, all the troopers were accounted for. One Redwine trooper had been wounded in the leg and was the only casualty to hostile fire on the raid.SFC Joseph M. Murray was hit from behind as he prepared to grenade the first structure he encountered after debarking Apple 02. His assailants were killed by team leader MSG Herman Spencer.

Shortly after its departure, Apple 03 mistook a support fighter for a MiG and called a warning, and although one of the Combat Apple KC-135s supporting the mission issued information that no MiGs had taken off, the entire force descended to treetop altitude. Apple 04 reported that an air-to-air missile had been launched at it and missed, but this was later found to have been aerial rockets fired into a hillside by one of the A-1 escorts, jettisoning ordnance to increase maneuverability as a result of the erroneous MiG call.

The assault formation was out of North Vietnam by 03:15 and landed back at Udorn at 04:28, five hours after launch. The crew of the damaged F-105 was compelled to eject over northern Laos, thirty minutes after being hit and within sight of its tanker, when its engine flamed out from lack of fuel.Campbell and Hill (1996), p. 120. Alleycat, the C-130E Airborne Control and Command (ABCCC) aircraft in orbit at the time over northern Laos, coordinated with several USAF entities, including Brigham Control in Thailand and ground resources in Laos, to cover the downed crewmen with supporting aircraft until a search and rescue effort could be mounted. Lime 01, refueling at Udorn, took off again using the call sign King 21 to coordinate the recovery, while Lime 02 refueled Apple 04 and Apple 05 to extend their flight time. Supported by the C-123 Candlestick flare aircraft diverted from its station on another mission by Alleycat, a SAR force was launched, and when its A-1s arrived from Nakhon Phanom to cover the pickups, Apple 04 and Apple 05 each recovered one of the downed airmen at first light after three hours on the ground.

 Aftermath 

 Intelligence controversy 

While the mission was deemed a "tactical success" because of its execution and the message it conveyed, critics proclaimed it an "intelligence failure". The 65 prisoners at Sơn Tây had been moved on 14 July because its wells had become unusable possibly due to contamination by flooding, to a camp  closer to Hanoi that the POWs dubbed "Camp Faith". The existence of "Camp Faith" (Dong Hoi) was only revealed to US intelligence on Thursday November 19th, 1970, in a coded message from Nguyen Van Hoang, an intelligence source in North Vietnam. Although relatively near Sơn Tây, the risk of disastrous consequences from lack of reconnaissance, planning and rehearsing precluded a switch of targets at the last minute. A mission with Camp Faith as the objective required a lengthy delay for a new window of acceptable conditions,Moorer advised Nixon at their November 18 meeting that the next window would be in March 1971, four months hence. which increased the chance of security compromise and further withheld personnel and equipment from their parent commands. New reports of increasing numbers of deaths among POWs argued strongly against such a delay. The raid went as planned in the event that the renewed activity at Sơn Tây noted in aerial reconnaissance photos taken 13 November involved POWs.

Despite the mission's intelligence shortcomings, the gathering of accurate intelligence for the operation, in both quality and quantity, was remarkably successful.Schemmer (1976), pp. 217–219. The shortcomings lay in "compartmentalization" of the information and isolation of the JTCG from "the normal intelligence flow". As early as the Polar Circle feasibility group, which conducted its capability assessment at the Defense Intelligence Agency's Arlington Hall facility rather than the Pentagon, members of the rescue operation were isolated from contact with outside organizations and closely monitored to prevent accidental leaks to the curious that might irreparably harm security.  In his history of the operation, John Gargus, a planner and participant, has no evidence that anyone in the intelligence community knew the POWs had been removed from the Son Tay Camp. However he conceded the possibility of the existence of compartmented scraps of intelligence of such a nature: "We concede that the raid was allowed to take place because those who had the correct intelligence information were not aware that someone was contemplating a POW rescue."

By the time the only intelligence implying the lack of prisoners at Son Tay was received (the coded message in a pack of cigarettes which listed POW camps and the number of POWs in each—with no mention of Son Tay), prompting the Defense Intelligence Agency to do an intensive overnight re-analysis of all of its data, it was the day before the raid would launch. The finished overnight report was presented to the commanders (including Admiral Moorer) the day of the operation. The operation had been advanced 24 hours due to Typhoon Patsy and there was a 12-hour time difference with Southeast Asia. When a final meeting with Defense Secretary Laird took place at 05:00 (Washington, D.C., time) to determine if the mission should proceed, its launch was less than five hours away. There was no consensus on the reliability of the data and Blackburn was strongly predisposed to go ahead. One military analyst theorized that as a result, the highest-level decision makers succumbed to the phenomenon of "groupthink".

The Defense Department conducted an investigation into a possible breach of security as the reason behind the movement of the prisoners and concluded that none occurred.Gargus (2007), pp. 249–251. The intensity of the criticism, and leaks of information including reports of the operation, caused the Nixon Administration to reorganize both the military communications network and the government's intelligence apparatus.

 Recognition of participants 
For their actions, members of the task force received six Distinguished Service Crosses, five Air Force Crosses, and at least 85 Silver Stars, including all 50 members of the ground force who did not receive the DSC.It is probable that 102 Silver Stars were actually awarded as a result of Kingpin. Schemmer apparently gave an incomplete record of SS recipients, listing all of the crew members of Cherry 02 but only two members of Cherry 01. His list of helicopter crewmen likewise omits seven who did not participate in training at Eglin and thus were not on the original JCTG rosters. Likely these are omissions in research and those 17 crewmen were also awarded Silver Stars. Manor received the Distinguished Service Medal. A total of soldiers 49 were awarded the Silver Star for heroism. The successful demonstrations of joint operating capability in Ivory Coast and Kingpin were, in part, a model for the creation of a joint United States Special Operations Command in 1987.

 Impact of the raid 
Criticism of the raid, particularly in the news media and by political opponents of the Vietnam War and the Nixon Administration, was widespread and of long duration. Not only was the mission denounced as the result of poor or outdated intelligence, but charges were made that the operation caused increased mistreatment of the prisoners.Schemmer (1976), pp. 190–200.

However, as a result of the raid, the North Vietnamese consolidated their POW camps to central prison complexes. An area of the Hanoi Hilton formerly housing civilian and South Vietnamese prisoners became "Camp Unity", a block of large communal areas housing 50 POWs each. After their repatriation, many POWs said that being in close contact with other Americans lifted their morale, as did knowledge of the rescue attempt.Schemmer devotes an entire chapter to the positive effects of the raid on the prisoners' situation. Some POWs said that food, medical care and even seemingly basic things like mail delivery vastly improved after the raid.

 See also 
 Ban Naden raid

 Notes 
Footnotes

 References 

 Bibliography 

Websites

 External links 

 Son Tay Raider Association
 Rescue Attempt: The Son Tay Raid, exhibit page at the National Museum of the United States Air Force
 Interview with Sergeant Terry Buckler About the Son Tay Prison Camp Raid During the Vietnam War, republished from Vietnam Magazine, June 1997. Sgt. Buckler was a radio-telephone operator (RTO) with the Redwine group and the youngest participant.
 Account by Thomas Powell for The Patriot Files SSgt. Powell was an M60 machine gunner with the Greenleaf group and was awarded the DSC.
 Son Tay: A Story of Success, VietnamGear.com, republished from Behind the Lines'' magazine, July 2005. The article asserts that an American-led MACV-SOG reconnaissance mission took place prior to Kingpin, that the troops in the secondary school were Chinese special operations instructors known to be present, and that both sides classified that information.
 Color map of Son Tay raid, National Museum of the United States Air Force
 Son Tay Raid – military topographical mapsheet
 Operation Kingpin: The Son Tay Raid at specialoperations.com
 "Son Tay Raid MH-53M Pave Low IV Retired", Small Wars Journal

Conflicts in 1970
1970 in Vietnam
Ivory Coast
Ivory Coast
Ivory Coast
Ivory Coast
History of Hanoi
Ivory Coast
Military raids
Prison raids
November 1970 events in Asia
20th century in Hanoi